Lindeberg is a village in Sørum municipality, Norway. Its population is 926.

References

Villages in Akershus